Byblis rorida is a species of plant in the Byblidaceae family. It is endemic to Australia.

References

rorida
Least concern flora of Australia
Eudicots of Western Australia
Taxonomy articles created by Polbot